Trysome Eatone is the second and final album by Love Spit Love. It was released in 1997 on Maverick Records.

Critical reception
The Washington Post wrote that "the New York-based quintet employs a sparser, more open sound that even turns jazzy for the album's final track, 'November'." The Hartford Courant called the album "[Richard] Butler's most varied and interesting work in more than a decade." The Los Angeles Times praised the "harder edge that lies closer to post-punk and industrial rock than the atmospheric sonic layers of the Furs style." Phoenix New Times wrote that "there's a sense the aging New Waver is still full of himself, but when [Butler's] glancing, observational lyrics blend with his inherently melancholy vocals, the results make for as poetic an expression as you'll find in the pop-music bins."

Track listing
All songs written by Richard Butler and Richard Fortus, except "It Hurts When I Laugh", co-written by Tim Butler.
"Long Long Time" – 4:18
"Believe" – 3:52
"Well Well Well" – 3:21
"Friends" – 4:43
"Fall on Tears" – 4:20
"Little Fist" – 3:20
"It Hurts When I Laugh" – 4:46
"7 Years" – 2:56
"Sweet Thing" – 3:00
"All God's Children" – 4:29
"More Than Money" – 3:42
"November 5" – 4:08  
"How Soon Is Now?" (The Smiths cover) [bonus] – 4:25

Personnel
Love Spit Love
Richard Butler – vocals
Richard Fortus – guitar
Frank Ferrer – drums
Chris Wilson – bass guitar

Charts

References

1997 albums
Maverick Records albums
Love Spit Love albums